Charlie Christie (born 30 March 1966) is a Scottish professional football player and coach who played as a striker and latterly as a midfielder. He played for Inverness Caledonian Thistle throughout the club's first ten years of existence (1994–2004), making over 250 appearances, and later managed the club from January 2006 until August 2007. He also played in the Scottish Highland Football League for Caledonian and Inverness Thistle before those clubs merged to become Caledonian Thistle, and was a reserve player at Celtic. 

Charlie is the father of Ryan, who also played for Inverness Caledonian Thistle, and is currently playing for Bournemouth and Scotland.

Playing career
Born in Inverness in 1966, Christie began his professional football career in 1983, playing for Caledonian in the Scottish Highland Football League. In 1985 he was transferred to local rivals Inverness Thistle. In September 1987 he signed for Celtic, where he made 56 appearances and scored 25 goals for the reserve team. He was unable to break into the Celtic first team, partly due to the performances of Frank McAvennie, who played in the same striker position. Christie rejoined Caledonian in 1989, in the combined role of player and commercial manager.

In 1994, when Inverness Thistle and Caledonian merged to form Inverness Caledonian Thistle, Christie joined the new club, where he combined his playing role with running the Centenary Club lottery. Initially he played as a striker, before eventually moving back to a midfield role. He was the only player to play for Caley Thistle during all of the club's first ten seasons and played in many of the club's most memorable games during this period, including the 3-1 Scottish Cup defeat of Celtic on 8 February 2000, his performance in this game earning him the sponsor's Man of the Match award.

During later seasons, Christie combined his playing career with a role as a club coach. He retired from playing in May 2004, having made a total of 314 appearances and scoring 34 goals.

Coaching and management career
After retiring as a player, Christie continued in his role as a youth development coach at Caley Thistle. In November 2004, when then-manager John Robertson left Caley Thistle to become manager of Hearts, Christie assisted the club's Director of football Graeme Bennett in managing the team until a replacement could be found. When Craig Brewster joined as player-manager Christie was made first team coach and continued in this role until January 2006.

When Brewster left the club on 13 January 2006, Christie was appointed caretaker manager. On 27 January 2006 he was given the manager's job on a permanent basis, with Donald Park as his assistant. Christie made Ross County midfielder John Rankin his first signing as Caley Thistle manager with a fee of £65,000 paid to their Highland neighbours. The deal also smashed Caley Thistle's previous record transfer fee paid to Highland League Club, Lossiemouth FC. of £35,000 for striker Ian Stewart. Christie remained in the job for nearly nineteen months before his resignation in August 2007.

Honours
Manager
Scottish Third Division: 1996-97
Scottish Challenge Cup: 2003-04
Scottish First Division: 2003-04

References

External links

1966 births
Footballers from Inverness
Living people
Celtic F.C. players
Inverness Thistle F.C. players
Inverness Caledonian Thistle F.C. players
Inverness Caledonian Thistle F.C. managers
Scottish footballers
Scottish football managers
Scottish Football League players
Association football midfielders
Scottish Premier League managers
Caledonian F.C. players
Highland Football League players